Restart is the sixteenth studio album by Christian rock band the Newsboys, released on 10 September 2013 by Sparrow Records and produced by David Garcia, Seth Mosley, Joshua Silverberg, and Christopher Stevens.

Music and lyrics
At HM, Sarah Brehm said that "Restart is packed with tracks that compete with the quality of today's current mainstream pop music, and the lyrics are much more positive, encouraging and wholesome than what is on the radio", and that it was "unlike their previous albums as it's packed with electrifying beats rivaling radio pop music." Sarah Fine at New Release Tuesday wrote that this release was different from any of their past albums, yet stated that "The production quality is nearly flawless, and lyrically, working with some of the best songwriters in the industry shows in the quality of the work. While the lyrics take the band to a whole new level, the group's journey into uncharted sonic waters is the real game changer." At Jesus Freak Hideout, Mark Rice added that "It is no great secret that Tait's Boys have been progressively getting more poppy and electronic, but I could never have seen it coming for the Newsboys to venture into the realm of dubstep."

At Indie Vision Music, Jonathan Andre wrote that the release was "Full of powerful lyrics, infectious enthusiasm and pop-dance melodies that are new, fresh and invigorating, the band are able to deliver 16 songs full of intensity, hopefulness, encouragement and powerful truths directly from Scripture." Dave Wood of Louder Than the Music said that "This is the new style of modern worship, taken outside of the four walls of the church, and served up on an accessible plate that a secular-influenced generation will enjoy." At Christian Music Zine, Emily Kjonaas wrote that "The new-era Newsboys have rediscovered and solidified their sound, and you can hear it in Restart." Daniel Edgeman of Christian Music Review wrote that the album was "filled with how great our God and many other aspects of our Father." At Worship Leader, Randy Cross stated that "This isn't just fun music, but lyrics that drive home the purpose that we as Christians embrace", and added that "The musical style of the first four songs is very similar."

Critical reception

Restart garnered acclaim from music critics. Sarah Brehm felt the release "will be a contender for best pop album of the year in the CCM market." Tony Cummings of Cross Rhythms wrote that "Wherever you look you'll find cleverly conceived, expertly executed and, most important, spiritually uplifting pop music," with the Newsboys "clearly still a brand leader." Roger Gelwicks stated that "Restart is the best the Newsboys have ever sounded" and being "Comfortable in their own shoes and daring enough to stay interesting, the Newsboys are still a force to be reckoned with, and Restart is proof." Mark Rice of Jesus Freak Hideout felt that "There is lots of good to say about this album, a lot of it being simply a full album of original, fully Christ-centered material made by some excellent musicians." At Worship Leader, Randy Cross added that "Restart is a wonderful album from start to finish. It's electronica start only reinforces the more reflective songs that follow and creates a great balance overall." However, Cross noted that "While this beautifully sets up the more acoustic leaning songs, it may feel repetitive to the casual listener."

At New Release Tuesday, Sarah Fine wrote that this was the band "at the top of their game". CM Addict's Julia Kitzing wrote that the band "never looked back and their albums just keep getting better." At Indie Vision Music, Jonathan Andre found this to be "such a powerful and compelling album". Dave Wood at Louder Than the Music wrote that he "really did grow to love it." At Christian Music Zine, Emily Kjonaas rated the album a 3.25-out-of-five, and felt that because "Restart comes at a time where computerized, auto-tuned music seems to be popular among the mainstream industry" the release may become "popular amongst that crowd." However, she noted that "Newsboys fans may not find this record enjoyable, but Tait-led fans will enjoy Restart." On the other hand, Daniel Edgeman at Christian Music Review called this a "stand out album." At CCM Magazine, Matt Conner wrote that "Electronic dance music is here to stay and clearly so are the Newsboys." DeWayne Hamby, reviewing the album for Charisma, called it "a new collection of pop-flavored tracks".

Commercial performance
For the Billboard charting week of 28 September 2013, Restart was the No. 38 most-sold album in the entirety of the United States by the Billboard 200 and it was the No. 1 Top Christian Album as well.

Track listing

Personnel 
Newsboys
 Michael Tait – lead vocals
 Jeff Frankenstein – keyboards, backing vocals 
 Jody Davis – guitars, backing vocals 
 Duncan Phillips – drums, percussion , electronic percussion 

Additional musicians
 Christopher Stevens – keyboards, programming, backing vocals 
 Joshua Silverberg – programming, musician 
 Matt Stanfield – keyboards, programming 
 Justin Ebach – keyboards, programming 
 Tim Lauer – keyboards, programming 
 Seth Mosley – keyboards, programming, guitars, bass 
 David Garcia – programming, instruments
 Cole Walowac – keyboards, programming
 Jonathan White – programming, musician, backing vocals 
 Fred Williams – keyboards, programming
 Kipp Williams – programming 
 Chris McLeod – musician, backing vocals 
 Sean Power – musician
 Pete Stewart – guitars 
 Joe Weber – guitars 
 Tony Lucido – bass 
 Jeremy McCoy – bass 
 Mike "X" O'Connor – bass 
 Steven Kadar – drums 
 World Outreach Church Worship Choir – choir (11)
 Kevin Max – vocals (12, 15)

Production
 Wes Campbell – executive producer, management
 Dave Wagner – executive producer, management
 Christopher Stevens – producer, mixing 
 Joshua Silverberg – producer, engineer 
 Jonathan White – additional production, engineer 
 Seth Mosley – producer, vocal producer, editing 
 David Garcia – producer, engineer
 Kipp Williams – additional production, engineer 
 Dan Martine – engineer 
 Chris McLeod – engineer 
 Mike "X" O'Connor – engineer, editing 
 Jericho Scroggins – assistant engineer 
 Ken Andrews – mixing 
 Neal Avron – mixing 
 Nathan Dantzler – mixing 
 Jack Joseph Puig – mixing 
 Dave McNair – mastering 
 Steven Taylor – music direction 
 Christopher York – A&R
 Ken Johnson – A&R 
 Jan Cook – art direction, photography  
 Becca Wildsmith – design, artwork 
 Kristin Barlowe – photography 
 Christin Cook – hair stylist, make-up
 Annie Kearney – wardrobe

Charts

References

2013 albums
Newsboys albums
Sparrow Records albums